Sigurd Harald Lund (1823-1906), was a ballet dancer, choreographer and director.  He was Ballet master of the Royal Swedish Ballet in 1856-1862 and 1890-1894.

Sigurd Harald Lund was the son of the Danish actor Kristian Lund and Katharine Kristine Heckel. He married first to Hansine Leonardine Hansen, and later to the ballerina Hilda Lund.  He was a student of August Bournonville. He became a student at the Royal Swedish Ballet in 1832, a second dancer in 1846, premier dancer in 1849, and First Premier Dancer in 1853.  He also made choreographs for ballets.

References 

 Klas Åke Heed: Ny svensk teaterhistoria. Teater före 1800, Gidlunds förlag (2007) 

1823 births
1906 deaths
19th-century Swedish ballet dancers
Royal Swedish Ballet dancers
Ballet masters